Aleksander Zalewski (3 May 1854 – 20 October 1906) was a Polish botanist, professor of Lviv University.

Zalewski was an author of mycologic and physiographic works, in which he described flora of Poland.

References
 

1854 births
1906 deaths
19th-century Polish botanists
Polish mycologists
Academic staff of the University of Lviv